Koldo Obieta Alberdi (born 8 October 1993) is a Spanish professional footballer who plays as a forward for Miedź Legnica.

Club career
Born in Guernica, Biscay, Basque Country, Obieta finished his formation with hometown side Gernika Club. After making his first team debut in the 2011–12 season, he left the club in 2015, after achieving promotion from Tercera División.

On 3 July 2015, Obieta signed for Zamudio SD also in the fourth division, and scored 17 goals during the campaign as his side also achieved promotion. On 8 July 2016, he agreed to a deal with Segunda División B side SD Amorebieta.

On 17 July 2017, Obieta moved to SD Eibar and was assigned to the farm team also in the third level. On 5 July 2019, after suffering relegation, he joined CD Tudelano in the same category.

On 10 July 2020, Obieta returned to Amorebieta, and scored four goals during the campaign as his club achieved a first-ever promotion to Segunda División. He made his professional debut at the age of 27 on 23 August 2021, coming on as a late substitute for Iñigo Orozco in a 0–2 away loss against CD Mirandés.

On 20 June 2022, after trying to secure a move to Poland in order to stay closer to his girlfriend, he joined the newly promoted Ekstraklasa side Miedź Legnica on a two-year deal.

References

External links

1993 births
Living people
People from Guernica
Spanish footballers
Footballers from the Basque Country (autonomous community)
Association football forwards
Segunda División players
Segunda División B players
Tercera División players
Ekstraklasa players
III liga players
Gernika Club footballers
Zamudio SD players
SD Amorebieta footballers
CD Vitoria footballers
CD Tudelano footballers
Miedź Legnica players
Sportspeople from Biscay
Spanish expatriate footballers
Expatriate footballers in Poland
Spanish expatriate sportspeople in Poland